The following is a list of marsupials which have been taxonomically described in the 2000s.

Species of the infraclass Marsupialia of mammals discovered and described in the 2000s.

New species list
Arfak pygmy bandicoot — Microperoryctes aplini (2004).
Mountain brushtail possum — Trichosurus cunninghami  (2002).
Short-eared possum — Trichosurus caninus (2002).
Red-bellied gracile opossum Cryptonanus ignitus (2002).

Taxonomy
In 2002 it was discovered that the originally named mountain brush-tailed possum of Australia actually consists of two separate species. Due to taxonomic rules, the northern population has been renamed with the common name short-eared possum but will keep the scientific name Trichosurus caninus, while the southern population has been named with the common and scientific names mountain brush-tailed possum (Trichosurus cunninghami). This is because the original type specimen of the species was from the northern population, and therefore must keep the original scientific name.

See also

References

described in 2000s
Marsupials• described in 2000s
Marsupials